Clementina Arderiu (1889 in Barcelona – 1976) was a Spanish poet who wrote in the Catalan language.

Influences on her work included the Catalan language writer Josep Carner, and her husband, the poet Carles Riba.

Her poems tend to idealize daily life.

Works 
Cançons i elegies, 1916
L'alta llibertat, 1920
Poemes, 1936
Sempre i ara, 1946, Joaquim Folguera prize
Poesies completes, 1952
És a dir, 1968, Óssa Menor prize and Lletra d'Or prize
L’esperança encara, 1968

Recording from the Library of Congress 

 Clementina Arderíu reading twelve poems from her collected volumes, Poesia completas,1952.

References 

1889 births
1976 deaths
Catalan-language poets
20th-century Spanish poets
Spanish women poets
20th-century Spanish women writers
Writers from Barcelona